Halfmann Teleskoptechnik is a German-based manufacturer of professional robotic telescopes.

Origins and history
The professional branch of the company started in 1996 with delivery of special devices (siderostats) for the European Southern Observatory (ESO).

Projects
Recent telescope projects include the Hamburg Robotic Telescope HRT of the Hamburger Sternwarte (Hamburg Observatory) completed in 2005, the MONET telescopes installed at McDonald Observatory in Texas, and the South African Astronomical Observatory in South Africa.  STELLA and RoboTel telescopes erected at Izana Observatory in Tenerife and at Potsdam, Germany, and IRIS Infrared telescope to be installed at Cerro Armazones Observatory in Chile. All telescopes are designed for remote and robotic operation.

References 
 Halfmann Teleskoptechnik website
 HRT telescope website
 MONET telescopes website
 STELLA telescopes website

Telescope manufacturers
German brands
Companies based in Bavaria
Robotics companies of Germany
Manufacturing companies established in 1996